Guli may refer to:

Places
Guli, Bangladesh, a village
Guli, West Azerbaijan, a village
Guli Surkh, a town in north-western Tajikistan
Guli, Guangxi, a town in south-eastern China, birthplace of Dong Xi (writer)
Qaleh Rashid Aqa, a village in western Iran also known as Guli

Other uses
Mina Guli, Australian businesswomen
Pitu Guli (1865–1903), revolutionary from Ottoman Macedonia
FK Pitu Guli, a football club based in Kruševo, Macedonia
Guli, is a toy as known as " marble " in Indonesia, Singapore and Malaysia.

See also
Gu Li (disambiguation)